Daniel Thomas Morgan, Jr. (born December 19, 1978) is an American football executive and former linebacker who is the assistant general manager for the Carolina Panthers of the National Football League (NFL). He previously served as the director of player personnel for the Buffalo Bills and as the director of pro personnel for the Seattle Seahawks.  

Morgan played in the NFL for seven seasons and played college football for the University of Miami, where he was recognized as an All-American, and won multiple national awards. Morgan was drafted by the Carolina Panthers in the first round of the 2001 NFL Draft, and he earned a Pro Bowl selection in 2004.

Early years
Morgan was born in Clifton Heights, Pennsylvania.  He grew up playing football for the Clifton Heights Rams of the Bert Bell Football League near Philadelphia.  After playing freshman football at Upper Darby High School in Upper Darby Township, Pennsylvania, Morgan attended J. P. Taravella High School in Coral Springs, Florida.  As a senior, he was an all-county pick at tailback, linebacker, and strong safety for the Taravella Trojans.  As a junior tailback, he rushed for 1,322 yards and 13 touchdowns.

College career
Morgan attended the University of Miami and played for the Miami Hurricanes football team from 1997 to 2000.  He began his college career playing as a fullback, but was switched to weakside linebacker one week before the season started.  He became the first freshman linebacker to start for the Hurricanes since Ray Lewis in 1993. As a freshman, he was named second-team freshman All-American by the Sporting News after posting 105 tackles, three sacks, and one forced fumble.

As a sophomore, he became the first sophomore team captain in team history, and made the All-Big East Team, after leading the team with 150 tackles.  He was a finalist for the Butkus Award and the Nagurski Trophy as a junior, and was rewarded with a second-team All-Big East for collecting 139 tackles and 5 sacks.  He finally captured both awards, as well as the Bednarik Award, becoming the first player in NCAA history to win all three awards in a career (and the same year).  He was recognized as a first-team All-Big East selection, the Big East Defensive Player of the Year, and a unanimous first-team All-American in 2000.  Upon graduating, Morgan held the Hurricanes' team and Big East conference records for most career tackles with 532.

Morgan was inducted into the University of Miami Sports Hall of Fame at the 43rd Annual Induction Banquet in 2011.

Professional career

Carolina Panthers
Morgan was selected by the Carolina Panthers in the first round, with the 11th overall selection, in the 2001 NFL Draft.

In the 2001 season, he started 11 games at weakside and strongside linebacker, posting 75 tackles, 1 sack, 1 interception and 1 fumble recovery.

In his second season, Morgan helped turn the Panthers from the worst defense in the 2001 NFL season to the second-ranked defense, becoming the first team to make such an improvement in one season.  Morgan was also an integral part of the Panthers defense that led the team to Super Bowl XXXVIII, where he posted an NFL Super Bowl record 18 tackles (11 solo, 7 assists).  For the 2004 NFL season, he collected 109 tackles, two interceptions, two fumble recoveries, and five sacks en route to being named the starting linebacker for the NFC in the 2004 Pro Bowl.  In the 2005 NFL season, he was second on the team in tackles, behind Marlon McCree.

On November 6, 2007, Morgan was placed on injured reserve by the Panthers due to an ankle injury. The Panthers eventually released him on February 11, 2008.

New Orleans Saints
Morgan was signed by the New Orleans Saints for the 2008 season. However, on May 19, 2008, Morgan announced his retirement from the NFL, citing the slow recovery of injuries, particularly a partially torn Achilles tendon suffered during the 2007 season.

After sitting out the 2008 season, Morgan confirmed on January 26, 2009 that he had filed reinstatement papers with the NFL and expected to rejoin the New Orleans Saints; Morgan stated that he was completely healthy and ready to play. He was reinstated on February 12.  Morgan worked out with the Saints through the off-season, but he strained his calf muscle during a minicamp practice on June 5, 2009. On June 8, Morgan's agent, Drew Rosenhaus, announced that Morgan had informed the Saints that he would retire for the second time due to his continued injuries.

Career statistics
Regular season

Playoffs

Executive career
In 2018, Morgan was hired by the Buffalo Bills as their director of player personnel. He was hired by the Carolina Panthers to be their assistant general manager on May 8, 2021.

References

External links
Miami Hurricanes bio

1978 births
Living people
All-American college football players
American football linebackers
College Football Hall of Fame inductees
Carolina Panthers players
J. P. Taravella High School alumni
Miami Hurricanes football players
National Conference Pro Bowl players
New Orleans Saints players
People from Clifton Heights, Pennsylvania
Players of American football from Pennsylvania
Sportspeople from Coral Springs, Florida
Sportspeople from Delaware County, Pennsylvania
Carolina Panthers executives
Buffalo Bills scouts 
Seattle Seahawks scouts